William A. Gabor (May 13, 1922 – June 4, 2019) was an American professional basketball player. A 5'11" guard/forward known as "Billy the Bullet", Gabor played collegiately at Syracuse University in the 1940s. He averaged 12.1 points per game during his freshman year before joining the United States Army Air Corps in 1943. Gabor's jersey was retired by Syracuse University on March 1, 2009.

Gabor spent his professional career with the Syracuse Nationals of the National Basketball League and later the National Basketball Association. He played with Syracuse until injuries forced him into retirement in 1955.  In his NBA career, Gabor averaged 9.8 points per game and logged one NBA All-Star Game appearance.  He won a league championship with Syracuse in 1955.

Time at Syracuse University
When Gabor first began playing basketball at Syracuse, there was a freshman and varsity team. He started all the freshmen games and then would suit up for the varsity game. Gabor started his first game on varsity against Cornell in 1942–43 season and scored 22 points. He started every game after that.

Gabor holds many school records, including: 
Only person to lead the team in scoring all four years they took the court
First to score 400 points in a single season
First to score over 1,000 points in a career

He held the all-time scoring record until Dave Bing bested it.

On May 1, 2009, Gabor was invited back to the Carrier Dome to see his jersey number 17 retired.

Family
Gabor was married once. He had three children: Bill, Bob and Hallie, and eight grandchildren: Annie, Emily, SarahRose, Malone, Mimi, Jack, Will, and Madison. He last resided in Jupiter, Florida.

NBA career statistics

Regular season

Playoffs

References

External links
College statistics
NBA statistics

1922 births
2019 deaths
All-American college men's basketball players
American men's basketball players
United States Army Air Forces personnel of World War II
American people of Hungarian descent
Basketball players from New York (state)
Military personnel from New York (state)
National Basketball Association All-Stars
People from Jupiter, Florida
Point guards
Rochester Royals draft picks
Sportspeople from Binghamton, New York
Syracuse Nationals players
Syracuse Orange men's basketball players